Insaniyat Ke Devta is a 1993 Hindi action film directed by K. C. Bokadia. The film stars Rajinikanth, Raaj Kumar, Manisha Koirala and Vinod Khanna.

Plot
Balbir and Anwaar are close friends who are both honest and brave, and always willing to lend a helping hand to any one who is in need, including the people behind an Ashram (rest house for the poor). They are in love with two lovely ladies Paro and Husna Bano. Balbir's younger brother Vivek is a student and has fallen in love with another lovely young lady Nisha. Nisha is the daughter of Ranjit, a rich tycoon who will do anything to take over the land and property of the Ashram, demolish it, and begin construction on it. He enlists the help of corrupt Jail Minister Veni Prasad Bhandari and Thakur Shakti Singh. When Balbir and Anwar frustrate his attempts, he has them thrown in jail and has the Ashram demolished by a bomb, placed by an escaped jail inmate. Balbir and Anwar escape from jail and avenge the demolition and death of the innocent, including Babaji by killing Ranjit in broad daylight, for which they are arrested and get a life sentence. The jail they are in is in charge of Jailer Rana Pratap, who is a strict disciplinarian, as well as honest and incorruptible. All three learn to respect each other. Meanwhile, Balbir's brother Vivek is framed for the murder of Nisha's mom Sumitradevi and he too gets a jail sentence. Balbir and Anwar's jail escapades are frustrated by Rana Pratap. Will justice be finally served? Who are behind the killing of Sumitradevi?

Cast
 Raaj Kumar as Jailor Rana Pratap Singh
 Vinod Khanna as Balveer 
 Rajinikanth as Anwar
 Jaya Prada as Paro 
 Varsha Usgaonkar as Husn Banu
 Vivek Mushran as Vivek
 Manisha Koirala as Nisha
 Raza Murad as Minister Veni Prasad Bhandari
 Shakti Kapoor as Thakur Shakti Singh
 Yunus Parvez as Dharamdas
 Vikas Anand as Principal 
 Ajit Vachani as Ranjeet
 Rakesh Bedi as Dholakia
 Joginder as Tilakdhari
 Avtar Gill as Assistant Jailor Chaudhary
 Senthil as Muthuswamy 
 Javed Hyder as Raju

Soundtrack

References

External links 
 

1993 films
1990s Hindi-language films
Films scored by Anand–Milind
Films directed by K. C. Bokadia
Indian action drama films